Granata is a genus of small sea snails, marine gastropod mollusks in the family Chilodontaidae (formerly in the family Trochidae, the top snails).

Species
Species within the genus Granata include:
 Granata cumingii (A. Adams, 1854)
 Granata imbricata (Lamarck, 1816)
 Granata japonica (A. Adams, 1850)
 Granata lyrata Pilsbry, 1890
 Granata maculata (Quoy & Gaimard, 1834)
 Granata sulcifera (Lamarck, 1822)
Species brought into synonymy
 Granata elegans (Gray, 1847): synonym of Stomatella elegans Gray, 1847 (superseded combination)

References

 Macpherson, J.H. & Gabriel, C.J., 1962. Marine Mollusca of Victoria. Melbourne Univ. Press, Melbourne (p. 55 : discussion of the validity of the introduction of  Granata as new name)
 Moore, R.C. (1964). Treatise on Invertebrate Paleontology. Part 1. Kansas : University of Kansas Press and Geological Society of America. Vol.1 
 Lee, J.J., 1990. . Korean J. Mal., 6(1):33-44.
 Herbert D.G. (2012) A revision of the Chilodontidae (Gastropoda: Vetigastropoda: Seguenzioidea) of southern Africa and the south-western Indian Ocean. African Invertebrates, 53(2): 381–502

 
Chilodontaidae
Gastropod genera